Blerim is a village and a former municipality in the Shkodër County, northern Albania. At the 2015 local government reform it became a subdivision of the municipality Fushë-Arrëz. The population at the 2011 census was 913.

Settlements
The municipal unit of Blerim includes the following seven villages:

Flet
Xeth
Kulumri
Trun
Blerim
Dardhë
Qebik

References

Former municipalities in Shkodër County
Administrative units of Fushë-Arrëz
Villages in Shkodër County